The Education Act 1964 was an Act of the Parliament of the United Kingdom. It made provisions in two areas which were previously not permitted by the Education Act 1944. These provisions included the setting up of Middle Schools, and the funding of education for pupils in Special Schools beyond compulsory school age.

The Act was repealed in its entirety by the Education Act 1996, which incorporated its provisions into broader legislatory reform.

References

External links
Education Act 1964 (as enacted)

1964 in education
United Kingdom Acts of Parliament 1964
United Kingdom Education Acts